Jung Jae-eun may refer to:
 Jung Jae-eun (taekwondo)
 Jung Jae-eun (actress)